The Japanese manga series You're Under Arrest features a cast of characters by Kosuke Fujishima. The series centers around two female police officers of contrasting personalities and their activities at Bokuto Station.

Main characters

Natsumi Tsujimoto
 is a police officer stationed at the Bokuto Station in Tokyo's Sumida Ward.

Miyuki Kobayakawa

Ken Nakajima

 is a motorcycle patrol officer portrayed in the live action by actor Kazushige Nagashima.

Teizō Saejima
 Season 3 Full Throttle.
 A Police Motorcycle Rider member  with a scratch on his forehead Working with Police Officer Police Officer Ken Nakajima. Although there was no name, it is one of the few general officers inherited from the original.

Yoriko Nikaidou

 is a dispatcher at Bokuto Station portrayed in the live action by actress Otoha.

Futaba Aoi

 is a transgender woman officer.

Saori Saga
 Voiced by: Sakura Tange (Japanese) Mayumi Iizuka (2nd Season Fast & Furious & Season 3 Full Throttle ) (Japanese), Megan Hancock (English) Saori Saga kun is 18 year old Middle High School Student & she has a sibling sister 17 year old Sayōfuka Saga.

Kaori Takano

 Voiced by: Haruka Tomatsu Season 3 Full Throttle.

Sakura Fujieda

 Voice by: Kana Hanazawa Season 3 Full Throttle

Chief

Secondary characters

Officers

Takao Arizuka

(蟻塚 貴男 Arizuka Takao) Is an (警視 Keishisei), he is feared by low-ranking officers since his mere presence in a police station during inspection would mean the end of someone's career as he always bring a notebook with him.

Kaoruko Kinoshita

(木下 薫子 Kinoshita Kaoruko)  Is an (警部補 Keibuho) Assistant Inspector serving in Chiyoda Police Headquarter & Sumida Bokutō Police Station in the last three season 1, The Movie Theatrical and season 2 fast and furious During the course of her career, Kaoruko had participated in at least one Tokyo Metropolitan Police Department Color Guard parade. Unit in 2008 she did not appeared in Season Three Full Throttle.

Chie Sagamiōno

Shouji Toukairin
 Is a (巡査長 Junsachō) Chief Police Officer.

Serving in Toyama Prefecture Police Mountain and he serve in Bokutō Police Station.

Inspector Tokuno

Nobuyuki Sugihara

Shunsuke Okabayashi
 
Shunsuke is played by actor Noboru Kaneko.

Civilians

Daimaru Nakajima

Sena Wakabayashi
Voiced by: Hiroko Konishi (1st Season)/Fumiko Orikasa (2nd Season) (Japanese), Ashley McDaid (English)

Boxy

Strikeman

50 C.C. Old Lady

Yūji Katsui

Saki Abdusha
. Season 1 Episode 22 Yoriko Nikaidō's Day Off. 

Prince of Middle East was exile to Japan order by Section Chief or Kachō.

Randy Hammond

Cast 

Police Officer Adviser Fukumurа Mаkаno sаying:

References

Characters
You're Under Arrest